Adnan bin Saidi (1915 – 14 February 1942) was a Malayan military officer of the 1st Infantry Brigade who fought the Japanese at the Battle of Pasir Panjang in Singapore during World War II. He is lauded as a national hero in Singapore and Malaysia for his actions during the battle. His name has been given to the Malaysian Infantry Fighting Vehicle (MIFV).

Battle of Pasir Panjang

In 1942, Adnan led a 42-strong platoon from the Malay Regiment to defend Singapore from the invading Japanese Imperial Army. They fought at Pasir Panjang Ridge in the Bukit Chandu area between 12 and 14 February. Despite being heavily outnumbered, Adnan refused to surrender and urged his men to fight to the end. They held off the Japanese for two days amid heavy enemy shelling from artillery and tanks, as well as chronic shortages of food, medical supplies and ammunition. On the last day of the battle, Adnan and his men were left with only a few grenades and had to fight the Japanese with their bayonets in brutal hand-to-hand combat. Adnan was shot but continued fighting.

During the battle, Adnan identified Japanese soldiers who were attempting to infiltrate the Malay Regiment's base in disguise as "Punjabi soldiers", who were marching four abreast (Japanese style) instead of three (British style).

Capture and death 
Although it is widely agreed that Adnan was killed during the Battle of Pasir Panjang on 14 February 1942, the exact details surrounding his death differed between accounts from both sides of the war. The actual circumstances of his death were never officially recorded.

The Imperial Japanese Army's official account indicated that Adnan was executed and then hung upside down from a cherry tree after two days of stubborn resistance and refusal to surrender. Other accounts suggest that he might have been tied to the tree and repeatedly bayoneted to death. British accounts confirmed that his corpse was found hung upside down after the surrender and this has been repeated in a number of authoritative texts on the Malayan Campaign.

Personal life and family
Adnan was born of Minangkabau descent in Sungai Ramal (present-day Bandar Baru Bangi), near Kajang, Selangor, Malaya. He was the eldest child in his family. His younger brothers, Ahmad and Amarullah, were also soldiers. Ahmad was KIA after his ship, HMS Pelandok, was sunk by the Japanese en route to Australia. Amarullah survived the war and resides in Kajang, Selangor.

Adnan married Sophia Pakir, an Islamic religious teacher, in 1938. They had a daughter who died soon after birth, and two sons: Mokhtar, who lives in Seremban, and Zainudin, who lives in Johor. Mokhtar recalled that his father "did not talk a lot", was "a strict man and believed in discipline", and was "always serious and fierce ... yet had a good heart. There seemed to be a 'light' illuminating his face." Sophia died in 1949.

Legacy
Adnan is considered a national hero in Singapore and Malaysia due to his courageous and valiant actions at the Battle of Pasir Panjang. The promotion of Adnan as a national, Malay war hero was championed by Singaporean newspaper Berita Harian in 1995. In 1999 Singapore Prime Minister Goh Chok Tong claimed Adnan as a national hero and he appeared in school text books from 2000.

War memorial
A war memorial plaque honouring Adnan and the Malay Brigade was commissioned by Prime Minister of Singapore Lee Kuan Yew in 1995 at Vigilante Drive, Kent Ridge Park, Singapore.

A colonial-era bungalow at Bukit Chandu was converted into Reflections at Bukit Chandu, an interpretative centre about the Battle of Pasir Panjang.

The Art in Transit programme of Pasir Panjang MRT station, titled Lieutenant Adnan, by Ho Tzu Nyen, features mock posters all around the station and lift shaft for a fictional movie about Adnan, who is portrayed by Singaporean actor Aaron Aziz.

Portrayal in film
Adnan was portrayed by Malaysian actor Hairie Othman in the 2000 film Leftenan Adnan.

He was also portrayed by an unknown Malay actor in the 2001 Singaporean television series A War Diary.

Aaron Aziz also portrayed Adnan in an episode of the 2004 historical series Life Story from Mediacorp Channel 5, which also covers his personal life.

In May 2016, a Singaporean actor Fadhlur Rahman also played as Adnan in Heroes: Battle of Bukit Chandu aired by Mediacorp Channel 5, Channel 8, Suria, Vasantham and Channel NewsAsia. In the episodes, there were interviews with Adnan's granddaughter Wan Sofia Zainuddin.

Singapore's Bicentennial
On 5 June 2019, on Hari Raya Aidilfitri, President Halimah Yacob launched commemorative notes featuring Lt. Adnan Saidi along with 7 others in a $20 commemorative notes marking Singapore's Bicentennial celebration, 1819–2019 edition.

References

External links
 Adnan Saidi

Singaporean people of World War II
British colonial army officers
Malaysian people of Minangkabau descent
Singaporean people of Minangkabau descent
1915 births
1942 deaths
Malaysian Muslims
Malaysian people of Malay descent
People from Selangor
Malaysian emigrants to Singapore
Singaporean people of Malay descent
British Malaya military personnel of World War II
British military personnel killed in World War II